Cycloramphus carvalhoi is a species of frog in the family Cycloramphidae.
It is endemic to Brazil.
Its natural habitat is subtropical or tropical moist montane forest.

References

carvalhoi
Endemic fauna of Brazil
Amphibians of Brazil
Taxonomy articles created by Polbot
Amphibians described in 1983
Fauna of the Atlantic Forest